Dong-wook is a Korean masculine given name. Its meaning depends on the hanja used to write each syllable of the name. There are 24 hanja with the reading "dong" and 11 hanja with the reading "wook" on the South Korean government's official list of hanja which may be registered for use in given names.

People with this name include:
Song Dong-wook (born 1962), South Korean former tennis player
JK Kim Dong-wook (born 1975), South Korean singer
Lee Dong-wook (born 1981), South Korean actor
Shin Dong-wook (born 1982), South Korean actor
Kim Dong-wook (born 1983), South Korean actor
Choi Dong-wook (born 1984), stage name  Se7en, South Korean singer

See also
List of Korean given names

References

Korean masculine given names